The COVID-19 Congressional Oversight Commission (COC) is an oversight body in the United States created by the CARES Act. They will report to Congress every 30 days on how the Department of the Treasury and the Federal Reserve Board manage the funds until September 30, 2025. These reports will assess:
 The economic impact the disbursements have on the populace, financial markets, and financial institutions
 The transparency of how the money is used
 The long-term costs and benefits to taxpayers taking on loans made by the legislation

Membership
The COC has a similar composition and remit as the TARP Congressional Oversight Panel. It will have five members, one member each appointed by the House Speaker (Nancy Pelosi), House Minority Leader (Kevin McCarthy), Senate Majority Leader (Mitch McConnell), Senate Minority Leader (Chuck Schumer), and the chair chosen jointly by the House Speaker and Senate Majority Leader. They need not be members of Congress. As of 18 May 2020, the chair remained vacant, as the House Speaker and Senate Majority Leader had not yet agreed. The current membership is:

117th Congress

116th Congress

Reports 
The committee released its first report on 18 May 2020. It describes how the $500 billion Treasury Department fund will function.

See also 
 Pandemic Response Accountability Committee
 Special Inspector General for Pandemic Recovery
 United States House Select Subcommittee on the Coronavirus Crisis

References

U.S. federal government response to the COVID-19 pandemic
Law associated with the COVID-19 pandemic in the United States
Organizations established in 2020